The 2009 California mid-air collision occurred at sea, west of San Diego, on 29 October. It involved a Lockheed HC-130H Hercules of the United States Coast Guard and a Bell AH-1 SuperCobra of the U.S. Marine Corps. There were no survivors among the nine crewmates aboard either aircraft.

Accident
At 19:10 local time on 29 October 2009 (02:10 on 30 October UTC), a Lockheed HC-130H Hercules aircraft of the United States Coast Guard and a Bell AH-1W Super Cobra helicopter of the United States Marine Corps collided in mid-air. The Hercules was carrying a crew of seven and the Cobra a crew of two people; there were no survivors. Eyewitnesses reported seeing a fireball in the sky. Debris from the collision was reported at the scene. The Hercules was on a Search and Rescue mission to search for a sailboat in distress while the Super Cobra was on a training flight. ,  and  later joined the search.

Aircraft

HC-130 Hercules
The HC-130H Hercules involved was serial number 1705. The aircraft was c/n 382-4993 and it had formerly served with the United States Air Force as 83-0007. It was based at the Coast Guard Air Station in Sacramento, California. It had been in service previously at Air Station Barber’s Point, Hawaii.

AH-1W Super Cobra
The Super Cobra was operated by Marine Aircraft Group 39, based at Camp Pendleton. Personnel aboard the aircraft belonged to Marine Aircraft Group 39 and the 3rd Marine Aircraft Wing, based at Miramar.

Investigation
A joint investigation by the United States Coast Guard and the U.S. Marine Corps was opened into the accident, headed by Rear Admiral Korn. The investigation concluded in mid-2010 and each agency released its own report of findings. Both agencies found that there was no single cause for the incident, and there was no misconduct on the part of any aircrew involved. However, both identified serious failings on the part of the U.S. Navy air traffic control center that had responsibility for the airspace within which the collision occurred.

See also

2009 Hudson River mid-air collision

References

Aviation accidents and incidents in the United States in 2009
Accidents and incidents involving the Lockheed C-130 Hercules
21st-century military history of the United States
United States Coast Guard
United States Marine Corps aviation
Mid-air collisions
Mid-air collisions involving helicopters
Mid-air collisions involving military aircraft
Aviation accidents and incidents in California
2009 in California
October 2009 events in the United States